The Clinch River is a river that flows southwest for more than  through the Great Appalachian Valley in the U.S. states of Virginia and Tennessee, gathering various tributaries, including the Powell River, before joining the Tennessee River in Kingston, Tennessee.

Course
The Clinch River is dammed twice: by Norris Dam, the first dam built by the Tennessee Valley Authority (TVA); and by the Melton Hill Dam, the only TVA dam with a navigation lock that is not located on the main channel of the Tennessee River.

An important tributary of the Clinch River is the Powell River.  The Clinch and Powell River drainage basins are separated by Powell Mountain. Tributaries entering the Clinch River below Norris Dam but above Melton Hill Dam include Coal Creek, Hinds Creek, Bull Run Creek, and Beaver Creek. Poplar Creek enters the river below the Melton Hill Dam.

History
A peninsula located at the mouth of the Clinch River, called Southwest Point, was the site of an early frontier fort which has been recently reconstructed. This site was important to Native Americans. A treaty between the Cherokees and the white settlers was signed at Southwest Point, allowing the capital of Tennessee to be moved there. The Tennessee General Assembly fulfilled this requirement technically by meeting in Kingston for one day, and then voting to move the capital city elsewhere.

Clinch was the name of an 18th-century explorer of the area. Former variations of the name included "Clinch's River", "Clench River", "Clinches River" and "Fiume Clinchs". Folk etymology, however, provides a more colorful account: the river received its name after a pioneer fell into it, and shouted "Clinch me! Clinch me!", supposedly meaning "clench me" or "grab me". An older name for the river, which appears on some early maps, was the "Pelisipi River", with such variant spellings as "Pelisippi" and "Pellissippi", and the variant form "Fiume Pelissipi". In fact, the Mitchell Map (1755–1757) labels a tributary of the "Pelisipi River" as "Clinch's River". The word "Pellissippi" was long said to have been the Cherokees' name for the river and was purported to mean "winding waters" in the Cherokee language. However, research completed in 2017 instead concludes that the Miami-Illinois name  ("river of the Mosopelea" tribe) was first applied to what is now called the Ohio River. The name Pellissippi has been used in proper names throughout East Tennessee, for example in Pellissippi Parkway and Pellissippi State Community College.

A power plant sits on the Clinch River at Carbo in Russell County, Virginia. It was completed in 1957, and it is owned by Appalachian Power, a part of American Electric Power (AEP). The plant was converted from burning coal to natural gas in 2016. The Virginia City Hybrid Energy Center, another coal-fired power plant that began operations in 2012, is a few miles away outside St. Paul in Wise County, Virginia. It is owned by Dominion Virginia Power.

Pollution from mining in the region has caused great concern among environmentalists because several rare species inhabit the river. Some mussels were reintroduced to the Cleveland, Virginia area from outside the state in the early 2000s after pollution in the 20th century wiped out much of the population.

In 2008, a large release of fly ash from the TVA's Kingston Fossil Plant deposited 2.6 million pounds of fly ash in the lower section of the river below the confluence of the Emory River. Although at first the TVA began cleaning the ash out of the river, in 2009 the EPA took over and finished removing coal ash in 2010. The release of coal ash in rivers has been shown to result in increased sedimentation and the exposure of trace elements to aquatic organisms. A study done several months after the spill revealed that the river had increased amounts of trace metals such as mercury and arsenic. A study done a year after the spill showed that there was a possibility of food web accumulation of methylmercury but this had not yet been shown.

Ecology
The Clinch River above Clinton, Tennessee (tailwaters of Norris Dam) is stocked with rainbow trout and brown trout by the Tennessee Wildlife Resources Agency.

Before being dammed, the Clinch River was a major producer of freshwater mussels and pearls.  The rivers of the southern Appalachians are still notable for their unusually rich mussel biodiversity. The mussels were an important food source for Native Americans and were later used by settlers as bait and hog feed. The freshwater pearl industry thrived throughout the southern Appalachians in the late 19th century and early 20th century. The Clinch River and the Emory River were considered the economic heart of the pearl industry, and the state of Tennessee was one of the top six states in the United States for pearl production.  The mussel-based industries began to decline in the early 20th century and were effectively eliminated by the dams built by the TVA. The first major Tennessee River dam was Wilson Dam, built at a site known as Muscle Shoals, which could refer to the freshwater mussels of the region (the shoals could also be named for the exertion necessary to move river traffic across them). Norris Dam and Norris Lake on the Clinch River flooded one of the other  areas of mussel near Young's Island.

Recreation
There are several state and local parks along the Clinch River in both Tennessee and Virginia.

State Parks in Tennessee include:
Big Ridge State Park
Norris Dam State Park
Chuck Swan State Forest

See also
List of rivers of Tennessee
List of rivers of Virginia

References

External links

 Columbia Gazetteer of North America

 Pellissippi Blueway
 

Rivers of Tennessee
Rivers of Virginia
Tributaries of the Tennessee River
Rivers of Anderson County, Tennessee
Rivers of Tazewell County, Virginia
Rivers of Russell County, Virginia
Rivers of Wise County, Virginia
Rivers of Hancock County, Tennessee
Rivers of Claiborne County, Tennessee
Rivers of Grainger County, Tennessee